Tagajõgi is a river in Ida-Viru and Lääne-Viru County, Estonia. The river is 48.7 km long and basin size is 256.6 km2. It runs from Tudu Lake into Rannapungerja River.

Trouts live also in the river.

References

Rivers of Estonia
Ida-Viru County
Lääne-Viru County